Mirza Shahzad Akbar is a Pakistani politician and barrister who served as Advisor to Prime Minister Imran Khan on Interior and Accountability in the capacity of a Federal Minister in Cabinet, in office from August 2020. Before his appointment as Advisor to Prime Minister, Akbar served in National Accountability Bureau (NAB) as a deputy prosecutor. Shahzad Akbar resigns as PM’s adviser on accountability and interior.

Early life and education 

He completed his graduation in Bachelor of Laws (LLB) from the University of London, Master of Laws (LLM) from the University of Newcastle.

Career 
Mirza Shahzad Akbar is co-founder of Foundation for Fundamental Rights, a non-governmental organization with focus on fundamental rights enshrined in Constitution of Pakistan.
 
After serving as consultant for the U.S. Agency of International Development, He was declared persona non grata by United States once he became one of the leading attorneys in Pakistan who were dealing with litigations against drone strikes on civilians by United States in Federally Administrated Tribal Areas (FATA).

References

Living people
Pakistan Tehreek-e-Insaf politicians
Alumni of the University of London
Alumni of Newcastle University
Year of birth missing (living people)